Black Dyke Halt or Blackdyke was a railway station near Blackdyke, Cumbria on the Silloth branch, serving the small hamlet of Black Dyke and its rural district. In its early days trains called on Saturdays only (Market Day), being upgraded some years later. The station closed on 7 September 1964. The line to Silloth closed on 7 September 1964 as part of the Beeching cuts.

History 
The North British Railway leased the line from 1862, it was absorbed by them in 1880, and then taken over by the London and North Eastern Railway in 1923.  The halt then passed on to the London Midland Region of British Railways on nationalisation in 1948. The platform has been demolished.

Infrastructure
The halt sat close to the hamlet and had a single wood fronted platform with no platform shelter. Light was provided by two lamps. Level crossing gates were located at the platform end and a passenger shelter, or crossing keepers shelter, was located here.  The stop lay about two miles away from Silloth and three from Abbey Town railway station by train. It became a request stop in the 1950s.

References 
Notes

Sources
 Ramshaw, David (1997). The Carlisle Navigation Railway. Carlisle : P3 Publications. .
 White, Stephen (1984). Solway Steam. The Story of the Silloth and Port Carlisle Railways. 1854-1964. Carlisle : Carel Press. .

External links
 Black Dyke Halt Brian's Railway Years
 Black Dyke Halt John Charters
 The line with period photographs Holme St Cuthbert History Group
 Cumbria Gazetteer
 The station on a navigable Edwardian OS map National Library of Scotland
 The stationRail Map Online

Disused railway stations in Cumbria
Former North British Railway stations
Railway stations in Great Britain opened in 1856
Railway stations in Great Britain closed in 1964
Beeching closures in England
1856 establishments in England